William Morris (born June 27, 1939) is an American sports shooter and was an officer in the United States Army when he won the bronze medal in the 1964 Summer Olympics. This was the first medal won in this sport for the US in 40 years. He is a graduate of the University of Oklahoma.

References

1939 births
Living people
United States Distinguished Marksman
Olympic bronze medalists for the United States in shooting
People from Fairfax, Oklahoma
Sportspeople from Oklahoma
United States Army officers
Shooters at the 1964 Summer Olympics
University of Oklahoma alumni
Medalists at the 1964 Summer Olympics
American male sport shooters